Rahemanpur is a village in Kheralu Taluka in Mehsana district of Gujarat, India.

References

Villages in Mehsana district